River Valley Transit provides public bus transportation throughout Lycoming County, Pennsylvania.

Officially named  as the Williamsport Bureau of Transportation the system is called River Valley Transit to describe the mission and coverage area of the service. RVT was previously known as City Bus prior to the summer of 2005.

Service area
The city of Williamsport is home to the McDade Trade and Transit Center, which is the main station and central hub for all the bus routes. Relative to Williamsport and the main bus station, the service area includes the following:
to the south, across the West Branch Susquehanna River are the boroughs of South Williamsport and Duboistown;
to the west are Woodward and Piatt Townships, and the borough of Jersey Shore;
to the north is Old Lycoming Township, including Garden View and Grimesville;
and to the east are Loyalsock Township, and the boroughs of Montoursville, Muncy, and Hughesville, with Montgomery to the southeast, across the river.

Riding RVT
The Trade & Transit Center is located in downtown Williamsport, which is the central hub to the bus system.  It is located between West Third Street, Pine Street, and Laurel Street.  Also located next to the Trade & Transit Center is the Transit Scoop, where you can pass a few minutes with a bite to eat.  On the south side of West Third Street is the parking garage, allowing for riders to park their vehicles and ride the buses.
 An example of the parking garage being useful is during the Little League World Series baseball games held in South Williamsport.  Visitors can purchase passes which allow them to park away from the traffic congestion and quickly get to and from the games.

Daytime bus service officially begins at 5:30 a.m., and continues until 7:00 p.m.  After 7:00 p.m., the two Nightline buses provide service hourly as far east as the Lycoming Mall and as far west as the Reach Road industrial park.  The 'late' bus provides outbound only service going west, and offers transportation to employees at the Reach Road Industrial Park at 11 p.m.

Saturday services deviate from the weekday schedules on select routes.  Deviations can be a shorter route, not running as many trips, or not running at all (due to redundancy of another route or low ridership on Saturday).  RVT does not operate scheduled routes on Sunday.  The Little League World Series is the one exception where scheduled service is offered on Sunday.

Fares

Current as of September 2008

On the bus:
$2.00 - 1-ride
$2.50 - 2-ride OR 1-day

Passes purchased at the Trade & Transit Center:
$2.00 - 1-day
$10.00 - 7-day
$35.00 - 31-day
$10.00 - 10-ride
$18.00 - 20-ride
4 for $5.00 - 1-ride tokens

Others:
Transfers - FREE
valid for (1) hour
Children age 5 or less - FREE
Youth age 17 or less - $1.00
Seniors age 65+ with ID
FREE
Disabled (with ID) - $1.00
Student (with ID) - $0.75 (school days only)
Full-time Lycoming College and Pennsylvania College of Technology students ride for free at all times by showing valid college-issued ID.

Fleet

Current fleet

Previous Fleet

Route list
Newberry via Fourth Street
Montoursville
Park Avenue/Garden View
Loyalsock
South Side
East End
West Third Street/Industrial Park
Williamsport Regional Airport
Valley View Connector
Tri-Town Connector via Hughesville
Tri-Town Connector via Montgomery
Jersey Shore Connector
Vallamont
Lycoming Mall
Downtown Connector

Accessibility
All transit buses in active service are handicapped accessible 
have kneeling feature (right front)
have wheelchair accessibility
RTS buses have the wheelchair lift at the rear door.
801-803 and 901–908, 1101-1106 are ramp accessible.

References

External links
 River Valley Transit

Bus transportation in Pennsylvania
Transportation in Lycoming County, Pennsylvania
Paratransit services in the United States